Calochortus westonii, common name Shirley Meadow star-tulip, is a rare endemic plant known only from the Greenhorn Mountains range of the southern Sierra Nevada, within Kern and Tulare Counties, California.

It is vulnerable due to habitat loss from logging, development of ski resort, and fuel breaks.

Description

Flowers bloom May to June and petals are white or blue in color.

References

westonii
Endemic flora of California
Flora of the Sierra Nevada (United States)
Natural history of Kern County, California
Natural history of Tulare County, California
Taxa named by Alice Eastwood